The Show-Off is a 1926 American silent film comedy produced by Famous Players-Lasky and distributed by Paramount Pictures, based on the play of the same name by George Kelly. Directed by Mal St. Clair, the film stars Ford Sterling, Lois Wilson and Louise Brooks.

It's one of two films that co-starred popular Broadway actor Gregory Kelly (first husband of Ruth Gordon) who died shortly after The Show-Off wrapped production. The film was produced in Philadelphia and New York City thus becoming a sort of time capsule record of buildings long gone and neighborhoods changed.

Cast

Ford Sterling as Aubrey Piper
Lois Wilson as Amy Fisher Piper
Louise Brooks as Clara, Joe's Girl
Gregory Kelly as Joe Fisher
Claire McDowell as Mom Fisher
Charles Goodrich as Pop Fisher
Joseph W. Smiley as Railroad Executive

Preservation status
Preserved at the Library of Congress, the film can be found in near mint condition on a Library of Congress related DVD.

Remakes
The film has been remade a number of times:
 with Hal Skelly and Doris Hill as Men Are Like That (1930).
 as The Show-Off (1934) with Spencer Tracy, Madge Evans, and Lois Wilson in a different role.
 as The Show-Off (1946) with Red Skelton and Marilyn Maxwell.
On February 2, 1955, a 60-minute version of the play aired on the CBS Television series The Best of Broadway.

References

External links

The Show-Off at SilentEra

1926 films
American silent feature films
Films directed by Malcolm St. Clair
Famous Players-Lasky films
Silent American comedy films
1926 comedy films
American films based on plays
American black-and-white films
1920s American films
1920s English-language films